Dhee is an Indian dance reality show telecasting in ETV. The show is produced by Mallemalla Productions and is  referred to as one of the biggest dance show in Telugu television industry.

The first season of the show was presented by Prabhu Deva. Rambha was the judge of the show in season four. The show has recently finished its 13th season with the name 'Dhee Kings Vs Queens' and has started another season named 'Dhee 14 Dancing Icon' where both are hosted by Pradeep Machiraju with Sushmita, Akhil Sarthak, Vamsi and Hyper Aadi as team leaders. Ganesh Master, Priyamani and Nandita Swetha as primary judges.

History
The show was started in the year 2009. It was directed by Kennedy in the first season with Prabhu Deva as presenter, next seasons saw Benzene and Deepthi Reddy, Mahesh, Sanjay, Nagaraju as directors. Later Sanjeev K Kumar took over the Dhee season 5 who has directed other television shows like Cash and Jabardasth for ETV Telugu. The creative director of the show is Naga Raju Goud. The season 7 and season 8 of the show were hosted by Niharika Konidela.

The season 9 of the show with the name Dhee Jodi started in 2016 and ended in June 2017. The show although right from inception was proving to be the largest in South India, the argument became undebatable from around this season as it gained a national recognition with contestants from all across the country. Directed by Nitin and Bharath, Dhee Jodi (Dhee 9) was hosted by Pradeep Machiraju with Shekhar Master and Sadha as the judges. Sudigali Sudheer and Rashmi Gautam were the promotional team. Dhee 10 started with Shekar Master, Priyamani and Anee as judges with four teams (Sudheer, Rashmi, Varshini, Hemanth.) Later during the progress of the season 10, the four teams were combined into two teams (Sudheer and Varshini) and (Rashmi Gautam and Hemanth) teams. Dhee 10 Winner is Raju (Chitti master). Lately the show has been receiving both criticism and praise from various corners for adding more comedy and gymnastic elements in addition to being a dance reality show.  Dhee jodi (Dhee 11) was hosted by Pradeep Machiraju and judged by Shekar Master, Priyamani, and Anee Master (later replaced by Poorna). The team leaders were Sudigali Sudheer and Rashmi Gautam. The winner of the season was Mahesh and Ritu (Prasanth Master). Dhee Champions (Dhee 12) was judged by Sekhar Master, Priyamani and Poorna. The two teams, Sudigali Sudheer and Rashmi Gautam against Hyper Adi and Varshini. Dhee Season 12 winner is Piyush Gurbhele ( Yaswanth Master). Dhee 13 Kings v/s Queens (Dhee 13) is being judged by Shekhar Master, Priyamani and Poorna. The two teams are namely Kings led by Sudigali Sudheer and Hyper Aadi and Queens led by Rashmi Gautam and Deepika Pilli. It is being hosted by Pradeep Machiraju.

Show format
The Participants perform a dance one by one. The participant's master will choose based on performance of individual dancer. So selection process will done on basis of dance performance of participant dancer. If there is tie i.e., when a single participant been chosen by one or more masters then decision will be in hands of judges.

Once all masters and contestants perform, judges vote on the performances.

In the basic format the show consists of three rounds, rach round the winning team will get 1 lakh INR, and three successive losses will result in elimination of losing team. At the end of each episode the best performer is awarded 1 lakh INR.

However, significant changes in the format have taken place at various seasons. A significant change in the current season DHEE 13 is the amount the winning gets differs from the 1st round to 3rd round by 1 Lakh INR each round, the remaining format remains unchanged.

Seasons

References 

Telugu-language television shows
Indian reality television series
Indian dance television shows
Dance competition television shows
ETV Telugu original programming